eSpew was a free online MP3 music search engine and download service. eSpew maintains that it is the largest directly linked MP3 database in the world.

Unlike Google, eSpew does not cache or host any of the MP3 files it delivers via its search engine. As of June 13, 2012, espew.com was down. On March 10, 2015, the search engine returned and is currently ranked on page 1 of Google's search engine for the keyword "MP3 Search Engine". eSpew claims to have crawled 19,318,115 MP3 files.

References

External links
eSpew

American music websites
Music search engines